Alexandre Le Grand may refer to:

 Alexander the Great, known in French as le Grand
 Alexandre le Grand, a stage play by Jean Racine
 Alexandre Le Grand (merchant) (1830–1898), the inventor of Bénédictine liqueur